Simeon is a given name. Simeon may also refer to:

Buildings
A.J. Simeon Stadium, multi-use stadium in High Point, North Carolina, United States
Simeon B. Robbins House, historic home located at Franklinville in Cattaraugus County, New York, United States
Simeon Moore House, historic house and farmstead located along Cane Run on Taylorsville Road, near Fisherville, Kentucky, United States
Simeon P. Smith House, historic house in Portsmouth, New Hampshire, United States
Simeon Rockefeller House, historic house located in Germantown, New York, United States
Simeon Sage House, historic home located at Scottsville in Monroe County, New York, United States

Geography
Mount Simeon, highland region in Aleppo Governorate in Syria
Mount Simeon District, district (mantiqa) of the Aleppo Governorate in Syria
Simeon, Nebraska,  unincorporated community in Cherry County, Nebraska, United States
Simeon, Virginia, unincorporated community in Albemarle County, Virginia, United States
Simeon Peak, mountain in the South Shetland Islands, Antarctica

Other
A Song for Simeon, poem by American-English poet T. S. Eliot
Simeon (email client), former IMAP4 email client
Simeon Career Academy, vocational high school in Chicago, Illinois

See also
Saint Simeon (disambiguation)
San Simeon (disambiguation)
Simeon (surname)